Purbrick is a surname. Notable people with the surname include:

Lizzie Purbrick (born 1955), British equestrian
Reginald Purbrick (1877–1950), British politician
Tim Purbrick (born 1964), British Army officer